Sabin Dănuț Lupu (born 14 March 1993) was (and possibly still is) a Romanian professional footballer who played as a midfielder for CSO Filiași.

Honours
Hermannstadt
Cupa României: Runner-up 2017–18

References

External links
 
 

1993 births
Living people
People from Dolj County
Romanian footballers
Association football midfielders
CS Pandurii Târgu Jiu players
Liga I players
Liga II players
CS Gaz Metan Mediaș players
FC Hermannstadt players
FC U Craiova 1948 players
SSU Politehnica Timișoara players
CSC 1599 Șelimbăr players